Couchsachraga Peak is a mountain located in Essex County, New York. 
"Couchsachraga" is based on an Algonquin or Huron name for the area, meaning "dismal wilderness".  The mountain is part of the Santanoni Mountains of the Adirondacks. Couchsachraga Peak is flanked to the east by Panther Peak.  There is no marked trail to the summit, which, being fully forested, has no views.

Couchsachraga Peak stands within the watershed of the Cold River, which drains into the Raquette River, the Saint Lawrence River in Canada, and into the Gulf of Saint Lawrence.
The southern sides of Couchsachraga drains into Calahan Brook, thence into Moose Creek and the Cold River. 
The northeast and northern sides of Couchsachraga drain via several brooks into the Cold River.

Couchsachraga is within New York's Adirondack Park.

See also 
 List of mountains in New York
 Northeast 111 4,000-footers
 Adirondack High Peaks
 Adirondack Forty-Sixers

References

External links 
 

Mountains of Essex County, New York
Adirondack High Peaks
Mountains of New York (state)